World Cup Stadium station is a railroad station in South Korea.

 World Cup Stadium station (Seoul)
 World Cup Stadium station (Daejeon Metro)